The New York City Subway is a rapid transit system that serves four of the five boroughs of New York City in the U.S. state of New York: the Bronx, Brooklyn, Manhattan, and Queens. Operated by the New York City Transit Authority under the Metropolitan Transportation Authority of New York, the New York City Subway is the busiest rapid transit system in the United States and the seventh busiest in the world, with 5.225 million daily riders. The system's  stations qualifies it to have the largest number of rapid transit stations in the world.

Three rapid transit companies merged in 1940 to create the present New York City Subway system: the Interborough Rapid Transit Company (IRT), the Brooklyn–Manhattan Transit Corporation (BMT), and the Independent Subway System (IND). All three former systems are present in Queens.

History and description 
Until 1915 most rapid transit in Queens consisted of streetcars, primarily those owned by affiliates of the Brooklyn Rapid Transit Company, but some included trolleys owned by the Long Island Consolidated Electrical Companies, a holding company co-owned by the Long Island Rail Road and Interborough Rapid Transit Company. Some steam dummy lines also entered Queens from Brooklyn, most notably the Atlantic Avenue Rapid Transit lines along the Atlantic Branch and part of the Main Line of the Long Island Rail Road. As far back as 1885, proposals existed for a tunnel between Midtown Manhattan and Long Island City designed to connect the Long Island Rail Road and the New York Central and Hudson River Railroad with a trolley line. Construction hazards, economic despair, and the transfer of ownership of this project delayed completion of the tunnel. This tunnel would eventually be known as the Steinway Tunnel.

The oldest subway line in Queens is the BMT Myrtle Avenue Line which was extended from Brooklyn into Ridgewood and Middle Village, replacing a steam dummy line. This was followed by the IRT Flushing Line, which had only one station in Long Island City, until it was extended with Dual Contracts to Astoria in 1916, Corona on April 21, 1917, and Downtown Flushing on January 2, 1928. The BMT Fulton Street Line extended from the City Line section of Brooklyn into Ozone Park and Richmond Hill on September 25, 1915. The same dual contracts project that brought about the extension of the IRT Flushing Line also lead to the opening of the BMT Astoria Line on February 1, 1917, as well as a connecting spur from the IRT Second Avenue Line over the Queensboro Bridge on July 23, 1917. The Astoria Line was the northernmost line owned by the BMT. The BMT Broadway-Brooklyn Line entered Queens from the Cypress Hills section of Brooklyn and ran through Woodhaven and Richmond Hill on May 28, 1917, and finally towards Downtown Jamaica on July 3, 1918.

The city-owned Independent Subway System installed two lines in Queens on August 19, 1933; the IND Crosstown Line ran south from Court Square in Long Island City to Greenpoint in Brooklyn, and was expanded to Downtown Brooklyn on July 1, 1937. The IND Queens Boulevard Line entered from Manhattan and ran to Jackson Heights, then to Kew Gardens on December 31, 1936, then to 169th Street in Jamaica on April 24, 1937. One last station at 179th Street was built on December 10, 1950. From 1939 to 1940, IND installed a spur off the Queens Boulevard Line called the IND World's Fair Line. The line was demolished after the closing of the 1939 World's Fair and the remnants can be found in the Jamaica Yard. A devastating fire on the trestle of the Rockaway Beach Branch of the Long Island Rail Road in Jamaica Bay in 1950 lead to the gradual closure of the branch, as well as part of the Far Rockaway Branch and the replacement of both by the IND Rockaway Line by 1956, replacing many but not all former LIRR stations. One other station (Far Rockaway–Mott Avenue) would be opened on February 21, 1958, and the LIRR replaced it with a new station three blocks east a month later. When the IND connected the Fulton Street Subway to the BMT Fulton Street Elevated on April 29, 1956, the former segments of the line in Ozone Park and Richmond Hill was officially "recaptured" by the IND.

The newest subway lines to be built were the Archer Avenue Lines, which opened on December 11, 1988, and replaced the demolished sections of the BMT Jamaica Line in Downtown Jamaica itself with an additional connecting spur to the IND Queens Boulevard Line, and the 63rd Street Lines on October 29, 1989 from the Upper East Side and Roosevelt Island.

Lines and services 

There are 81 New York City Subway stations in Queens, per the official count of the Metropolitan Transportation Authority; of these, 10 are express-local stations. If the 2 station complexes are counted as one station each, the number of stations is 78. In the table below, lines with colors next to them indicate trunk lines, which determine the colors that are used for services' route bullets and diamonds. The opening date refers to the opening of the first section of track for the line. In the "division" column, the current division is followed by the original division in parentheses.

Stations 

Permanently closed subway stations, including those that have been demolished, are not included in the list below. Numerically named stations that are attached with a geographic location before them (Forest Hills–71st Avenue and Jamaica–179th Street) are listed under the geographic location name.

See also

Notes

References

Further reading

 
New York City Queens
Subway
Subway stations